is an underground railway station on the Minatomirai Line in Naka-ku, Yokohama, Kanagawa Prefecture, Japan, operated by the third-sector railway operating company Yokohama Minatomirai Railway Company.

Lines
Trains through-run to and from the Tokyu Toyoko Line from Shibuya Station and beyond on the Tokyo Metro Fukutoshin Line and Tobu Tojo Line and Seibu Ikebukuro Line.

Station layout
Nihon-ōdōri Station is an underground station with a single island platform serving two tracks.

Platforms

History
Nihon-ōdōri Station opened on 1 February 2004, coinciding with the opening of the Minatomirai Line.

Passenger statistics
In fiscal 2011, the station was used by an average of 21,879 passengers daily.

Surrounding area
 Yokohama Stadium - 2-minute walk, heading south of the station
 Osanbashi Pier - 5-minute walk, heading north of the station
 Kanagawa Prefectural Government ("King's Tower") - at the Kenchō Exit (western end of the station)
 Naka Ward Office - 2-minute walk, heading south of the station
 Yokohama Archives of History

See also
 List of railway stations in Japan

References

External links

  

Naka-ku, Yokohama
Railway stations in Kanagawa Prefecture
Railway stations in Yokohama
Railway stations in Japan opened in 2004